Euthictis chloratma is a moth of the family Oecophoridae. It was first described by Edward Meyrick in 1916. This species is endemic to New Zealand. The classification of New Zealand endemic moths within the genus Euthictis is regarded as unsatisfactory and in need of revision. As such this species is currently also known as Euthictis (s.l.) chloratma.

References

Oecophorinae
Moths of New Zealand
Moths described in 1916
Taxa named by Edward Meyrick
Endemic fauna of New Zealand
Endemic moths of New Zealand